A. Devitt Vanech (March 26, 1906 – September 10, 1967) was an American attorney who served as the United States Assistant Attorney General for the Environment and Natural Resources from 1947 to 1951 and as United States Deputy Attorney General from 1951 to 1952.

References

1906 births
1967 deaths
United States Deputy Attorneys General
United States Assistant Attorneys General for the Environment and Natural Resources Division
Truman administration personnel